Dmitry Vitalyevich Sarsembayev (born 29 November 1997) is a Russian snowboarder.
 
He competed in the 2017 FIS Snowboard World Championships, and in the 2018 Winter Olympics, in parallel giant slalom.

References

External links

1997 births
Living people
Russian male snowboarders
Olympic snowboarders of Russia
Snowboarders at the 2018 Winter Olympics
People from Tashtagol
Universiade gold medalists for Russia
Universiade bronze medalists for Russia
Universiade medalists in snowboarding
Competitors at the 2019 Winter Universiade
Sportspeople from Kemerovo Oblast
21st-century Russian people